Dioryctria dominguensis is a species of snout moth in the genus Dioryctria. It was described by Herbert H. Neunzig in 1996 and is known from the Dominican Republic.

References

Moths described in 1996
dominguensis